Zane Vaļicka (born c. 1973) is a Latvian former beauty queen and reality TV show contestant. She became Miss Latvia and competed in Miss World 1992; however, she was unplaced. Vaļicka competed in Latvia's Dancing with the Stars, with her partner, Oļegs Kuzņecovs.

References

Living people
1970s births
Miss World 1992 delegates
Place of birth missing (living people)
Year of birth missing (living people)
Latvian beauty pageant winners